Sonstorps IK is a Swedish football club located in Finspång.

Background
Sonstorps IK currently plays in Division 4 Östergötland Östra which is the sixth tier of Swedish football. They play their home matches at the Stråkvads IP in Finspång.

The club is affiliated to Östergötlands Fotbollförbund.

Season to season

Footnotes

External links
 Sonstorps IK – Official website

Football clubs in Östergötland County
Association football clubs established in 1921
1921 establishments in Sweden